Kellen Heard (born October 17, 1985) is a former American football nose tackle. He played college football at Texas A&M, then transferred to the University of Memphis with his last year of eligibility.

Professional career

Oakland Raiders 
After going undrafted in the 2010 NFL Draft, Heard signed with the Oakland Raiders as an undrafted free agent on April 30, 2010. He was waived on September 4, 2010 and re-signed to the practice squad two days later.

Buffalo Bills 
On December 11, 2010 Heard was signed off the Raiders practice Squad by the Buffalo Bills.

St. Louis Rams 
Heard was claimed off waivers by the St. Louis Rams in September 2012. He was released by the Rams on November 14.

Indianapolis Colts 
On November 27, 2012, Heard was signed by the Indianapolis Colts for undisclosed terms. On August 25, 2013, he was waived by the Colts.

References

External links 
Memphis Tigers bio
Buffalo Bills bio
Indianapolis Colts bio

1985 births
Living people
Players of American football from Texas
American football defensive tackles
Memphis Tigers football players
Oakland Raiders players
Buffalo Bills players
St. Louis Rams players
Indianapolis Colts players
Sportspeople from Galveston, Texas